Elke Barth (born 19 October 1956) is a German sprinter. She competed in the women's 4 × 400 metres relay at the 1976 Summer Olympics representing West Germany.

References

External links
 

1956 births
Living people
Athletes (track and field) at the 1976 Summer Olympics
German female sprinters
Olympic athletes of West Germany
Place of birth missing (living people)
Olympic female sprinters